Josh McKay is an American musician. He is best known as the bass guitarist for the indie rock band Deerhunter, with whom he has recorded three studio albums. McKay started his career in 1987 playing bass in Aleka's Attic, performing alongside friends and bandmates River Phoenix and Rain Phoenix.

After moving to Athens, GA, McKay became the founding member and frontman of post-rock band Macha and a member of the shoegaze band Mice Parade. In 2003, McKay also played guitar and keyboard in his friends Matt and Bubba Kadane's band The New Year.

McKay has also recorded solo material under the monikers Seaworthy, The Corsican and Abandon the Earth Mission.

Career
In 2002, McKay released a solo album, entitled The Ride, under the moniker, Seaworthy. The album was well received by Pitchfork, with reviewer Christopher Dare writing: "The narrative flow is enthralling. [...] It's the first good 2002 album I've heard."

McKay joined Deerhunter in early 2013, following the departure of longtime bassist Josh Fauver.

Discography
with Deerhunter
Monomania (2013)
Fading Frontier (2015)
Why Hasn't Everything Already Disappeared? (2019)

with Macha
Macha (1998)
See It Another Way (1999)
Macha Loved Bedhead (2000)
Forget Tomorrow (2004)

with Mice Parade
What It Means to Be Left-Handed (2010)

as Seaworthy
The Ride (2002)

References

Alternative rock bass guitarists
Year of birth missing (living people)
Living people
American rock bass guitarists
American male bass guitarists
Deerhunter members
Aleka's Attic members
Mice Parade members